Allison Paige McBryar (born May 27, 1982) is an American country music singer.

Early life
Paige was born in Refugio, Texas, and began performing in clubs in Texas with Whiskey River when she was 11 years old. She later joined the dancehall band Rhythm of the Road. She is of Italian descent.

Recording career
Her first single, a cover of Skeeter Davis' "The End of the World", was released by Capitol Records Nashville and peaked at number 72 on the Billboard Hot Country Singles & Tracks chart in May 2000.

Paige's debut album, End of the World, was released by Lofton Creek Records in June 2004. A music video was filmed for the first single, "Send a Message."

Discography

Albums

Singles

Music videos

References

1982 births
American women country singers
American country singer-songwriters
American people of Italian descent
Living people
Country musicians from Texas
People from Refugio, Texas
Capitol Records artists
Lofton Creek Records artists
Singer-songwriters from Texas
21st-century American singers
21st-century American women singers